an-Nabek District is a district of the Rif Dimashq Governorate in southern Syria. Administrative centre is the city of an-Nabek. At the 2004 census, the district had a population of 80,001.

The area of the district is also known as Qalamoun (also transliterated as Qalamun, Qalamūn, Kalamon and Kalamoun).

Sub-districts
The district of an-Nabek is divided into three sub-districts nawāḥī (population as of 2004):

Localities in an-Nabek District
According to the Central Bureau of Statistics (CBS), the following villages, towns and cities, make up the district of an-Nabek:

References

 
Districts of Rif Dimashq Governorate